Elefante is the eighth studio album by the American rock band BulletBoys. The album was released June 9, 2015 on Cleopatra Records. A music video was made for the track "Rollover".

Track listing 
Track listing adopted from Discogs. Note: Tracks 10 and 11 were pressed the wrong way around.

Personnel 
 Marq Torien- lead vocals, lead guitar
 Nick Rozz- guitar
 Chad MacDonald- bass
 Shawn Duncan- drums

Reception 

Jeff Legg of Metal-Temple.com deemed the album a "masterpiece", giving it a perfect 10/10 rating.

References 

2015 albums
BulletBoys albums
Cleopatra Records albums